Hyposmocoma makawao is a species of moth of the family Cosmopterigidae. It is known only from the Makawao Forest Reserve on Maui.

Adults differ from any other species in the genus Hyposmocoma, since no other species has a single, thick, transverse orange band near the base of the forewing.

Two wide, dark bands form a V-shape that crosses over the central region of the case.

Etymology
The species is named makawao after its type locality, Makawao Forest Reserve, Maui.

References

makawao
Endemic moths of Hawaii
Moths described in 2012